Ken Hands (26 October 1926 – 22 December 2017) was an Australian rules footballer in the Victorian Football League (VFL). On the death of teammate Alex Way on 7 November 2014, Hands became the last surviving member of Carlton's 1945 Premiership team, and was also the last surviving member of their 1947 Premiership team. On 22 December 2017, Hands died at the age of 91.

References

 Ken Hands at Blueseum

Holmesby, Russell and Main, Jim (2007). The Encyclopedia of AFL Footballers. 7th ed. Melbourne: Bas Publishing.

1926 births
2017 deaths
Australian rules footballers from Victoria (Australia)
Carlton Football Club players
Carlton Football Club Premiership players
Carlton Football Club coaches
John Nicholls Medal winners
Australian Football Hall of Fame inductees
North Geelong Football Club players
Two-time VFL/AFL Premiership players